Kogutud teosed. 1968–1980. Esimene osa. (Collected works. First part.) is the first compilation album by Estonian rock musician Urmas Alender, coupled with Kogutud teosed. 1981–1993. Teine osa.. The album was produced by Alender's daughter Yoko.

Track listing
 "Võta mind lehtede varju" (Take me under the cover of leaves) (Urmas Alender/Viivi Luik) – 2:34 (1975)
 "Haldjasaar" (Fairy island) (Urmas Alender/Rudolf Rimmel) – 2:10 (1975)
 "Armastuslaul" (Love song) (Urmas Alender/Jüri Üdi) – 2:46 (1975)
 "Heli" (Sound) (Urmas Alender/Juhan Viiding) – 2:16 (1980)
 "Veereva elu ragin" (Rattle of the rolling life) (Urmas Alender/Jüri Üdi) – 0:53 (1973)
 "Hüvasti kollane koer" (Goodbye yellow dog) (Urmas Alender/Urmas Alender) – 3:28 (1968)
 "Neli tähte" (Four letters) (Urmas Alender/Maret Tuurma) – 1:56 (1972)
 "Kuidas joonistada kurbust" (How to draw sadness) (Urmas Alender/Juhan Smuul) – 3:05 (1979)
 "Piiblite kustunud lõhnad" (Doused smells of the Bibles) (Urmas Alender/Viivi Luik) – 2:00 (1974)
 "Vihma, pimedat vihma" (Rain, dark rain) (Urmas Alender/Viivi Luik) – 3:05 (1974)
 "Katkemine" (Disconnection) (Urmas Alender/Hando Runnel) – 2:10 (1976)
 "Raskemeelsus"/"Hauakiri" (Gloom/Epitaph) (Urmas Alender/Hando Runnel) – 3:25 (1979)
 "Kivid, lambad" (Stones, sheep) (Urmas Alender/Hando Runnel) – 3:38 (1979)
 "Jaanipäevaks" (For St. John's Day) (Urmas Alender/Hando Runnel) – 1:59 (1979)
 "Igavene naine" (Eternal woman) (Urmas Alender/Hando Runnel) – 2:15 (1979)
 "Mälestus" (Memory) (Urmas Alender/Hando Runnel) – 1:34 (1975)
 "Ja kuigi veel" (And whilst yet) (Urmas Alender/Viivi Luik) – 2:09 (1974)
 "Ööpäev" (lit. Nightday [a term to describe the cycle of night and day]) (Urmas Alender/Jüri Üdi) – 3:50 (1973)
 "Peninukid" (lit. Hound knuckles) (Urmas Alender/Jüri Üdi) – 2:21 (1975)
 "Tuli" (Fire) (Urmas Alender/Juhan Viiding) – 2:22 (1980)
 "Mere laul" (Song of the sea) (Urmas Alender/Urmas Alender) – 3:18 (1979)

Urmas Alender albums
2000 compilation albums
Estonian-language albums